Ascom Group  is the largest oil and natural gas company in Moldova. The company has commercial operations in Kazakhstan, Turkmenistan and Sudan and produces around 500,000 tonnes of oil and around 1.3 billion m3 of natural gas per year.

The company owns in Kazakhstan proven reserves of 13 million tonnes of oil and 10 billion m3 of natural gas.

References

External links

 Company website

Oil and gas companies of Moldova
Energy companies established in 1994
Non-renewable resource companies established in 1994
1994 establishments in Moldova